Harley James Spence (November 27, 1904 – April 27, 1993) was a Canadian politician. He represented the electoral districts of Lunenburg County and Lunenburg West in the Nova Scotia House of Assembly from 1953 to 1970. He was a member of the Progressive Conservative Party of Nova Scotia.

Born in 1904 at Ellershouse, Hants County, Nova Scotia, Spence was a businessman by career. He married Ella Peach Riley in 1929. He served as a municipal councillor for West Hants from 1932 to 1942. Spence entered provincial politics in 1953 when he was elected in the dual-member Lunenburg County riding with R. Clifford Levy. In the 1956 election, Spence was re-elected by 67 votes in the newly established Lunenburg West riding. He was re-elected in the 1960, 1963, and 1967 elections. Spence did not reoffer in the 1970 election. Spence died in 1993 in Bradenton, Florida.

References

1904 births
1993 deaths
Progressive Conservative Association of Nova Scotia MLAs
People from Hants County, Nova Scotia
People from Lunenburg County, Nova Scotia